The banded banana frog (Afrixalus fulvovittatus) is a species of frog in the family Hyperoliidae.
It is found in Ivory Coast, Ghana, Guinea, Liberia, and Sierra Leone.
Its natural habitats are moist savanna, swamps, freshwater marshes, intermittent freshwater marshes, plantations, rural gardens, and heavily degraded former forest.
It is threatened by habitat loss.

Habitat
The Banded banana frogs natural habitats savanna and wetlands such as degraded former forests, they are not found in primary or secondary forests. Breeding takes place in on folded leaves above water, once hatched tadpoles will fall into the water and develop.

References

 Channing, A., & Howell K. (2006).  Amphibians of East Africa. Comstock books in herpetology. 418 p., [24] p. of plates. Ithaca: Comstock Pub. Associates/Cornell University Press,.
 Zimkus, B. 2012. Afrixalus fulvovittatus. African Amphibians Lifedesk

Afrixalus
Taxonomy articles created by Polbot
Amphibians described in 1860